The Taipei Economic and Culture Office in Austria; represents the interests of Taiwan in Austria in the absence of formal diplomatic relations, functioning as a de facto embassy. Its counterpart in Taiwan is the Austrian Office in Taipei.

History
The first representative office of Taiwan in Austria was known as the Institute of Chinese Culture, which was established in 1972.

Representatives
 Chen Lien-gene (-2016)
 Vanessa Shih (2016-)

See also
 List of diplomatic missions of Taiwan
 List of diplomatic missions in Austria

References

External links
 Taipei Economic and Cultural Office, Vienna, Austria

 

Taiwan
Austria
1972 establishments in Austria
Organizations established in 1972
20th-century architecture in Austria